The 2000 Nebraska Cornhuskers football team represented the University of Nebraska–Lincoln in the 2000 NCAA Division I-A football season. The team was coached by Frank Solich and played their home games in Memorial Stadium in Lincoln, Nebraska.

The Cornhusker's 2000 Red-White spring game featured Nebraska's first (and currently only) female player: KaLena "Beanie" Barnes, a senior sprinter for Nebraska's women's track-and-field teams, played in spring practice as a punter and recorded one 35-yard punt. She would not stay with the team for the regular season.

Schedule

Roster and coaching staff

Depth chart

Game summaries

San José State

Notre Dame

Iowa

Missouri

Iowa State

Texas Tech

Baylor

Oklahoma

Kansas

Kansas State

Colorado

Northwestern

Rankings

After the season
Nebraska finished in a tie for 1st place in the Big 12 North Division, and tied for 3rd conference-wide, with a final record of 10–2 (6–2).

The season was concluded by #9 Nebraska blowing out #18 Northwestern by 66–17, the largest margin of victory in Alamo Bowl history.

Head Coach Frank Solich's career record improved to 31–7 (18–6).

Awards

NFL and pro players
The following Nebraska players who participated in the 2000 season later moved on to the next level and joined a professional or semi-pro team as draftees or free agents.

References

Nebraska
Nebraska Cornhuskers football seasons
Alamo Bowl champion seasons
Nebraska Cornhuskers football